Guzmania cylindrica is a plant species in the genus Guzmania. This species is native to Venezuela and Colombia.

References

cylindrica
Flora of Colombia
Flora of Venezuela
Plants described in 1955